Míriam Colón Valle (August 20, 1936 – March 3, 2017) was a Puerto Rican actress. She was the founder and director of New York City's Puerto Rican Traveling Theater. Beginning her career in the early 1950s, she performed on Broadway and on television. She appeared on television programs from the 1960s to the 2010s, including Sanford and Son and Gunsmoke. She is best known as Mama Montana, the mother of Al Pacino's title character in Scarface. In 2014, she received the National Medal of Arts from President Barack Obama. She died of complications from a pulmonary infection on March 3, 2017, at the age of 80.

Early life
Míriam Colón Valle was born in Ponce, Puerto Rico, on August 20, 1936. In the 1940s, her recently divorced mother moved the family to a public housing project called Residencial Las Casas in San Juan. She attended Román Baldorioty de Castro High School in Old San Juan, where she took part in plays. Her first drama teacher, Marcos Colón (no relation) believed in her talent, and helped her gain permission to observe the students in the drama department of the University of Puerto Rico. She was a good student in high school and was awarded scholarships to the Dramatic Workshop and Technical Institute and Lee Strasberg's Actors Studio in New York City.

In New York, she befriended Dean Zayas, another young Puerto Rican actor and future director.

Career

In 1953, Colón debuted as an actress in Los Peloteros (The Baseball Players), a film produced in Puerto Rico, starring Ramón "Diplo" Rivero, and in which she played a character called Lolita. That year, she moved to New York City, where she was accepted by Actors Studio co-founder Elia Kazan after a single audition, thus becoming the studio's first Puerto Rican member. In New York, she worked in theater and later landed a role on the soap opera Guiding Light. She attended a performance of René Marqués' La Carreta (The Oxcart) which motivated her to form the first Hispanic theater group, with the help of La Carreta's producer, Roberto Rodríguez, called "El Circuito Dramático".

In 1954, she appeared on stage in "In The Summer House" at the Play House in New York City. Between 1954 and 1974, she made guest appearances in television shows such as Peter Gunn and Alfred Hitchcock Presents. She appeared mostly in westerns such as Gunsmoke, Bonanza, The High Chaparral, and Have Gun, Will Travel. She appeared in the 1961 film One-eyed Jacks as "the Redhead". In 1962, she was featured as the co-star in a teleplay written by Frank Gabrielsen, and produced for the TV series The DuPont Show of the Week. The title of the hour-long episode is "The Richest Man in Bogota", airing on 17 June 1962. It starred Lee Marvin as Juan de Núñez, and Miriam Colón as "Marina" (not Medina-Saroté, as in the original H.G. Wells story, The Country of the Blind).  She co-starred as Anita Chavez in Thunder Island (1963), with the screenplay written by Jack Nicholson. In 1963, she guest starred on Gunsmoke, playing the title character, a Comanche woman who marries a settler and the two must deal with the racial hatred of others due to it in the episode “Shona” (S8E22).

In 1979, she starred alongside fellow Puerto Rican actors José Ferrer, Raúl Juliá, and Henry Darrow in Life of Sin, a film in which she portrayed Isabel la Negra, a real-life Puerto Rican brothel owner. In 1983, she was cast as the mother of Tony Montana in Scarface, despite being only 4 years older than Al Pacino. Colón has said that she based her performance on her own mother. She was also cast as María in the 1999 film Gloria, starring Sharon Stone. In 2013, she was cast in the role of Ultima, a New Mexico Hispanic healer, in the movie Bless Me, Ultima based on the novel by Rudolfo Anaya. She appeared in Season 1 of the TV series Better Call Saul in 2015, as Abuelita.

Puerto Rican Traveling Theater

In the late 1960s, Colón founded The Puerto Rican Traveling Theater company on West 47th street in Manhattan, New York. The company presents Off-Broadway productions onsite and also goes on tour. She was the director of the company and she appeared in the following PRTT productions:
 The Ox Cart (1966–1967)
 The Boiler Room (1993)
 Simpson Street
 Señora Carrar's Rifles

The play The Ox Cart (La Carreta), written by Puerto Rican dramatist René Marqués, was first produced in 1953. It was directed by Roberto Rodríguez and starred Colón. The success of the play allowed Rodríguez and Colón to form the first permanent Hispanic theatrical group, and for the group to have its own space, Teatro Arena, located in Manhattan on Sixth Avenue between 43rd and 44th street.

Recognition

In 1993, Colón received an Obie Award for Lifetime Achievement in the Theater. In 2000, she received the HOLA Raúl Juliá Founders Award, presented by the Hispanic Organization of Latin Actors (HOLA).

Colón's biography, Míriam Colón: Actor and Theater Founder, was written by Mayra Fernandez in 1994.

In 2014, President Barack Obama awarded Colón the National Medal of Arts for her contributions as an actress. The citation reads as follows:  "Ms. Colón has been a trailblazer in film, television, and theater, and helped open doors for generations of Hispanic actors."

Personal life
Colón was married to George Paul Edgar from 1966 until his death in 1976. In 1987, she married Fred Valle.

She was an avid collector of ancestral arts including pre-Columbian, tribal African, historic Native American, and other tribal art. She collected Mid-East artifacts, abstract paintings, and modern sculpture. A signed Pablo Picasso sketch in crayon that she owned was auctioned for $6500 on June 16, 2019. At her death, she owned at least six signed movie posters of Al Pacino's Scarface and at least seven signed Scarface soundtrack albums.

Her final years were in Albuquerque, New Mexico.

Death
Colón died on March 3, 2017, at the age of 80, in New York City of complications from a pulmonary infection. Among those who paid tribute to her were Rosalba Rolón, Marc Anthony (who she had coached as an actor and briefly appeared with on television), and Lin-Manuel Miranda.

Filmography

 1951 Los Peloteros as Lolita
 1955 Danger (TV Series) 
 1955 Star Tonight (TV Series)
 1956 Crowded Paradise
 1956 Soraya (TV Series, three episodes) 
 1957 The Big Story (TV Series) as Esperanza Martinez
 1958 Decoy (TV Series) as Maria
 1956-1958 Studio One (TV Series) as Mrs. Talavera / Rosie
 1959 Lux Playhouse (TV Series) as Mrs. Flores
 1959 State Trooper (TV Series, Episode, Case of the Barefoot Girl) as Francesca
 1959 One Step Beyond (TV Series, Episode - The Hand) as Alma Rodriguez
 1959 Markham (TV Series) as Esperanza
 1959 Mike Hammer (TV Series) as Tarano
 1959 Peter Gunn (TV Series) as Maria DeCara
 1959 Tales of Wells Fargo (TV Series, Episode - Desert Showdown) as Rita
 1959 Wanted: Dead or Alive (TV Series, Episode - Desert Seed) as Mrs. Gomez
 1961 One-eyed Jacks as Redheaded Lady
 1961 Battle at Bloody Beach as Nahni
 1961 The Outsider as Anita
 1962 Alfred Hitchcock Presents (TV Series, Episode - Strange Miracle) as Lolla
 1962 The New Breed (TV Series) as Dolores Madero
 1962 The Richest Man in Bogota (TV Series, on The DuPont Show of the Week) as Marina
 1962 Doctor Kildare (TV Series) as Pila / Rani Stewart
 1962 The Defenders (TV Series) as Carmella Lopez
 1962 Gunsmoke (TV Series, Episode - He Learned About Women) as Kisla
 1963 Have Gun - Will Travel (TV Series) as Punya
 1963 Laramie (TV Series) as Winema
 1963 Death Valley Days (TV Series) as Maria
 1963 Harbor Lights as Gina Rosario
 1963 Ben Casey (TV Series) as Eva Rosario
 1963 The Great Adventure (TV Series) as Sarah Crow
 1963 Thunder Island as Anita Chavez
 1963 The Dick Van Dyke Show (TV Series) as Maria
 1963 Gunsmoke (TV Series, Episode - Shona) as Shona
 1964 The Nurses (TV Series) as Maria Marissa
 1964 Slattery's People (TV Series) as Elena Delgado
 1966 The Legend of Jesse James (TV Series) as Theresa
 1966 The Appaloosa as Ana
 1967 N.Y.P.D. (TV Series) as Teresa
 1967 The Fugitive (TV Series) as Mercedes Anza
 1967 The Virginian (TV Series) as Eva Talbot
 1967 Christmas in the Marketplace (TV Movie) as Virgin Mary / Mercedes
 1968 The High Chaparral (TV Series, Episode - “Follow Your Heart”) as Trini Butler
 1968 Gunsmoke (TV Series, Episode - Zavala) as Amelita Avila    
 1969 Desperate Mission (TV Movie) as Claudina, Otilia's Servant
 1969 Bonanza (TV Series) as Anita Lavez
 1969 Gunsmoke (TV Series, Episode - Charlie Moon) as The Woman
 1970 Gunsmoke (TV Series, Episode - Chato) as Mora
 1971 They Call It Murder (TV Movie) as Anita Nogales
 1972 Gunsmoke (TV Series, Episode - The River) as Paulette
 1972 The Possession of Joel Delaney as Veronica
 1974 Dr. Max (TV Movie) as Mrs. Camacho
 1974 Sanford & Son (TV Series, Episode - Julio and Sister and Nephew) as Carlotta
 1974 Gunsmoke (TV Series, Episode - The Iron Blood of Courage) as Mignon
 1976 The Hemingway Play (TV Movie)
 1979 A Life of Sin as Isabel
 1979 The Edge of Night (TV soap opera) as Dr. Marie Santos
 1981 Back Roads as Angel
 1981 ABC Afterschool Specials (TV Series) as Yolanda
 1983 Scarface (1983) as Mama Georgina Montana
 1984 Best Kept Secret (TV Movie) as Ina Dietz
 1985 Lady Blue (TV Series) as Dona Maria
 1986 Kay O'Brien (TV Series) as Mrs. Amaro
 1987 Highway to Heaven (TV Series) as Anna Martinez
 1988 Deadline: Madrid (TV Movie)
 1991 L.A. Law (TV Series) as Gaby Sifuentes
 1991 Law and Order (TV Series) as Mrs. Anna Rivers
 1991 Lightning Field (TV Movie)
 1991 City of Hope as Mrs. Ramirez
 1992 Murder, She Wrote (TV Series, Episode - Day of the Dead) as Consuela Montejano
 1993 The House of the Spirits as Nana
 1994 The Cosby Mysteries (TV Series)
 1994 NYPD Blue (TV Series) as Valeria Santiago
 1995 Streets of Laredo (TV Mini-Series) as Estrella
 1995 Sabrina as Rosa
 1995 All My Children (TV soap opera) as Lydia Flores
 1996 Edipo alcalde as Deyanira
 1996 Lone Star as Mercedes Cruz
 1996 Mistrial (TV Movie) as Mrs. Cruz
 1996 Cosby (TV Series) as Lillian
 1996-1997 One Life to Live (TV soap opera) as Abuelita Maria Delgado
 1999 Gloria as María
 2000 For Love or Country: The Arturo Sandoval Story (TV Movie) as Cirita Sandoval
 2000 All the Pretty Horses as Doña Alfonsa
 2001 Third Watch (2001, TV Series) as Theresa Caffey
 2001 The Blue Diner as Meche
 2001 Guiding Light (TV soap opera) as Maria Santos
 2001 Almost a Woman (TV Movie) as Tata
 2005 Jonny Zero (TV Series) as Lupe
 2005 Goal! as Mercedes
 2007 Goal! 2: Living the Dream... as Mercedes
 2007 The Cry as Gloria The Curandera
 2009 Law & Order: Special Victims Unit (TV Series) as Yolanda
 2009 Goal! 3: Taking on the World as Mercedes (uncredited)
 2010-2011 How to Make It in America (TV Series) as Cam's Grandma
 2011 Gun Hill Road as Gloria
 2011 The Bay (TV Series) as Grandma Andrews
 2011 Hawthorne (TV Series) as Mama Renata
 2011 Foreverland as Esperanza
 2013 Bless Me, Ultima as Ultima
 2013 Unhallowed as Bruja (rumored)
 2014 Top Five as Chelsea's Grandmother
 2014 On Painted Wings (not distributed) as Manuela
 2015 Better Call Saul (TV Series) as Abuelita Salamanca
 2015 The Girl Is in Trouble as Grandma
 2015 The Southside as Abuelita Sanchez

BroadwayIn The Summer House (1954)The Innkeepers (1956)The Wrong Way Lightbulb'' (1969)

See also

List of Puerto Ricans
History of women in Puerto Rico

References

External links
 
 

 
 
 
 Miriam Colón bio at the Internet Off-Broadway Database
 The Puerto Rican Traveling Theater
Miriam Colon's Interview on NBC Latino 
Miriam Colon Interview at the WNYC Archives

1936 births
2017 deaths
Obie Award recipients
Puerto Rican film actresses
Puerto Rican television actresses
Puerto Rican soap opera actresses
Puerto Rican stage actresses
Actresses from Ponce, Puerto Rico
Western (genre) television actors
United States National Medal of Arts recipients
Respiratory disease deaths in New York (state)
Infectious disease deaths in New York (state)
Deaths from respiratory tract infection